Joan McCall (born January 31, 1948, in Kentucky) is an American screenwriter, producer, actress and religious minister.

Career
Her first film roles were in the 1974 movies Devil Times Five and Act of Vengeance and the 1976 horror film Grizzly. She starred on Broadway in A Race of Hairy Men, Barefoot in the Park and Star-Spangled Girl.

A prolific screenwriter, she wrote the original screenplay of Heart Like a Wheel and 250 scripts for Days of Our Lives, Another World, Santa Barbara, Divorce Court and Search for Tomorrow.

She is a Science of Mind minister and served as the Spiritual Director of Creative Arts Center for Spiritual Living (CACSL) in Los Angeles until January 2011. She is married to Hollywood motion picture producer David Sheldon.

References 

1948 births
Living people
American film actresses
American stage actresses
American screenwriters
American women screenwriters
American soap opera writers
Women soap opera writers
21st-century American women